St Mary's College is a private Catholic primary and secondary school for girls located within the "square mile" of the city of Adelaide, South Australia.

History
At the request of Laurence Sheil, then the Bishop of Adelaide, St Mary's College was initiated by the Dominican Sisters, who arrived from the Dominican Convent in Cabra, Ireland, as missionaries. The foundation stone was laid in 1868. The Sisters of St Joseph of the Sacred Heart provided primary education for students from the lower socioeconomic status, while the Dominican Sisters took responsibility for middle-class girls from both Catholic and other religious backgrounds whose parents could afford post-primary education.

Academics
In 2021, over 800 girls attended the school in classes from Reception (age 5) to year 12 (age 17-18).

Houses
The school has four sporting houses, in which the students are positioned at the commencement of their enrolment at St Mary's. St Marys, St Dominics, St Catherines, and St Thomas each compete in annual sports days and swimming carnivals.

Extracurricular activities
St Mary's supports many charities and selects Year 11 students to attend pilgrimages annually. One is called the "Lands Trip," led by Robert Napoli, Learning Area Co-Ordinator for Religious Education. The Lands Trip selects 6 - 8 girls to travel into the APY Lands to visit an Aboriginal community and experience the literacy of some Indigenous Australians. This pilgrimage started in 2008 and is renowned for being tough on the emotions and physical abilities of the students embarking on this trip.

The other pilgrimage is to Vietnam. In 2005, 2006, 2007, and 2008 St Mary's College and Christian Brothers College students combined to participate in a Pilgrimage to Vietnam. The primary focus of the Pilgrimage is on giving service and working with orphaned, disabled children in the Phu My Orphanage in the Thi Nghe District, Saigon. The Orphanage, is operated by the Sisters of St Paul de Charters, where they provide care for over 300 children. While at the Orphanage, students participate in a range of activities and are immersed in the day-to-day operation of the Orphanage.

Campus

The campus contains:
 Four buildings containing classroom, computer, science, art and home economic facilities: the Boylan, Moore, Catherine and Kavanagh buildings
 Gymnasium
 Playground for Junior School
 Veritas Lawns and Convent Lawns
 Tennis courts 
 Transportable classrooms
 The Performing Arts Centre College
 The restored Chapel and Convent

The school also shares a campus with St Patrick's Catholic Church and resides next to the Archbishop's House on West Terrace. The school borders three streets, the front-facing Franklin Street, the west side along West Terrace, and the back facing Grote Street.

Notable alumni 

 Alex Chidiac, Matildas football player

References

External links 
 St Mary's College website

Educational institutions established in 1869
Girls' schools in South Australia
Catholic secondary schools in Adelaide
1869 establishments in Australia
Dominican schools in Australia
Alliance of Girls' Schools Australasia